The Second Canadian Ministry was the cabinet chaired by Prime Minister Alexander Mackenzie.  It governed Canada from 7 November 1873 to 8 October 1878, including the last two months of the 2nd Canadian Parliament as well as all of the 3rd.  The government was formed by the Liberal Party of Canada.

Ministries 

Prime Minister
7 November 1873 – 17 October 1878: Alexander Mackenzie
Minister of Agriculture
7 November 1873 – 15 December 1876: Luc Letellier de St-Just
15 December 1876 – 26 January 1877: Isaac Burpee (Acting)
26 January 1877 – 17 October 1878: Charles Alphonse Pantaléon Pelletier
Minister of Customs
7 November 1873 – 17 October 1878: Isaac Burpee
Minister of Finance
7 November 1873 – 17 October 1878: Richard John Cartwright
Superintendent-General of Indian Affairs
7 November 1873 – 17 October 1878: The Minister of the Interior (Ex officio)
7 November 1873 – 7 October 1876: David Laird
7 October 1876 – 24 October 1876: Richard William Scott (Acting)
24 October 1876 – 17 October 1878: David Mills
Minister of Inland Revenue
7 November 1873 – 8 July 1874: Télesphore Fournier
8 July 1874 – 9 November 1876: Félix Geoffrion
9 November 1876 – 8 June 1877: Rodolphe Laflamme
8 June 1877 – 8 October 1877: Joseph-Édouard Cauchon
8 October 1877 – 17 October 1878: Wilfrid Laurier
Minister of the Interior
7 November 1873 – 7 October 1876: David Laird
7 October 1876 – 24 October 1876: Richard William Scott (Acting)
24 October 1876 – 17 October 1878: David Mills
Minister of Justice
7 November 1873 – 1 June 1874: Antoine-Aimé Dorion
1 June 1874 – 8 July 1874: Albert James Smith (Acting)
8 July 1874 – 19 May 1875: Télesphore Fournier
19 May 1875 – 8 June 1877: Dominick Edward Blake
8 June 1877 – 17 October 1878: Rodolphe Laflamme
Attorney General of Canada
7 November 1873 – 17 October 1878: The Minister of Justice (Ex officio)
7 November 1873 – 1 June 1874: Antoine-Aimé Dorion
1 June 1874 – 8 July 1874: Sir Albert James Smith (Acting)
8 July 1874 – 19 May 1875: Télesphore Fournier
19 May 1875 – 8 June 1877: Dominick Edward Blake
8 June 1877 – 17 October 1878: Rodolphe Laflamme
Leader of the Government in the Senate
7 November 1873 – 14 December 1876: Luc Letellier de St-Just
14 December 1876 – 17 October 1878: Richard William Scott
Minister of Marine and Fisheries
7 November 1873 – 17 October 1878: Albert James Smith
Minister of Militia and Defence
7 November 1873 – 30 September 1874: William Ross
30 September 1874 – 21 January 1878: William Berrian Vail
21 January 1878 – 17 October 1878: Alfred Gilpin Jones
Postmaster General
7 November 1873 – 19 May 1875: Donald Alexander Macdonald
19 May 1875 – 9 October 1875: Télesphore Fournier
9 October 1875 – 17 October 1878: Lucius Seth Huntington
President of the Privy Council
7 November 1873 – 20 January 1874: Alexander Mackenzie (acting)
20 January 1874 – 9 October 1875: Lucius Seth Huntington
9 October 1875 – 7 December 1875: Alexander Mackenzie (acting)
7 December 1875 – 8 June 1877: Joseph-Édouard Cauchon
8 June 1877 – 18 January 1878: Edward Blake
18 January 1878 – 17 October 1878: Alexander Mackenzie (acting)
Minister of Public Works
7 November 1873 – 17 October 1878: Alexander Mackenzie
Receiver General
7 November 1873 – 17 October 1878: Thomas Coffin
Secretary of State of Canada
7 November 1873 – 9 January 1874: David Christie
9 January 1874 – 17 October 1878: Richard William Scott
Registrar General of Canada
7 November 1873 – 17 October 1878: The Secretary of State of Canada (Ex officio)
7 November 1873 – 9 January 1874: David Christie
9 January 1874 – 17 October 1878: Richard William Scott
Minister without Portfolio
7 November 1873 – 14 February 1874: Dominick Edward Blake
7 November 1873 – 9 January 1874: Richard William Scott

References

Succession

02
1873 establishments in Canada
1878 disestablishments in Canada
Cabinets established in 1873
Cabinets disestablished in 1878
Ministries of Queen Victoria